Franciscan Center may refer to:
 Franciscan Center of Baltimore
 Franciscan Center of Tampa